Neelathamara may refer to:
 Neelathamara (1979 film), a Malayalam-language romance film
 Neelathamara (2009 film), an Indian Malayalam-language romantic drama film, a remake of the above